Bad Boy Live! is a live album by John Sykes, released in 2004. The album was recorded during a Japanese tour in April 2004. The record features material from Sykes' solo career, as well as his time with Thin Lizzy, Whitesnake and Blue Murder.

Track listing
All songs written and composed by John Sykes, except where noted.

Personnel
Credits are adapted from the album's liner notes.

References

John Sykes albums
Albums produced by John Sykes
2004 live albums
Victor Entertainment live albums